Anders Prytz (born 15 November 1976) is a retired Swedish football defender.

References

1976 births
Living people
Swedish footballers
Örgryte IS players
GAIS players
Lyngby Boldklub players
Fredrikstad FK players
Association football defenders
Swedish expatriate footballers
Expatriate men's footballers in Denmark
Swedish expatriate sportspeople in Denmark
Expatriate footballers in Norway
Swedish expatriate sportspeople in Norway
Allsvenskan players
Danish Superliga players
Eliteserien players